Sivasankarapuram (சிவசங்கராபுரம்) is a village located 5 km away from Thalaivasal. It belongs to Pattuthurai panchayat and is situated in the district of Salem in the state of Tamil Nadu, South India. The place takes its name from Puram Shiva Shankar, one out of hundred names for Shiva. Agriculture and poultry are the two most important businesses in this region. The farmers mostly plant corn, sugarcane, tapioca, spices and vegetables such as chili, brinjal, radish, lady finger, just to name a few.

References

External links 
https://www.google.com/maps/place/Shivashankarapuram,+Tamil+Nadu+636112/@11.6102465,78.7313208,17z/data=!3m1!4b1!4m5!3m4!1s0x3bab76c4c4c2f3ed:0x8a7941b2728ca3a3!8m2!3d11.6093442!4d78.7329007
Distance from other cities.

Villages in Salem district